The 1898 South Carolina Gamecocks football team represented South Carolina College—now known as the University of South Carolina–as an independent during the 1898 college football season.  Led by Bill Wertenbaker in his first and only season as head coach, South Carolina compiled a record of 1–2.

Schedule

References

South Carolina
South Carolina Gamecocks football seasons
South Carolina Gamecocks football